Günter Siebert (born 1931) is a retired German light heavyweight (−82.5 kg) weightlifter who won bronze medals at the European championships of 1956 and 1956.

References

1931 births
Living people
German male weightlifters
European Weightlifting Championships medalists